The 2010–11 NCAA Division I men's basketball season began on November 8, 2010, with the preliminary games of the 2010 Coaches vs. Cancer Classic, and ended with the 2011 NCAA Division I men's basketball tournament's championship game on April 4, 2011, at Reliant Stadium in Houston. The tournament's first-round games occurred March 15–16, 2011, in Dayton, followed by second and third rounds on Thursday through Sunday, March 17–20. Regional games were March 24–27, with the Final Four played April 2 and 4.

Season headlines 
 Butler became the first program outside of one of the six "power conferences" to go to back-to-back Final Fours since UNLV in 1990 and 1991.
 On April 12, 2010, Centenary announced that it will be re-classifying to Division III for all of its sports upon the conclusion of the 2010–11 school year. First year men's basketball coach Adam Walsh led the Gentlemen in their final year as a Division I program. Notable Centenary basketball alumni include Hall of Famer Robert Parish and the 2000–01 NCAA scoring champion Ronnie McCollum.
 On June 4, 2010 legendary college basketball player and coach John Wooden died at the age of 99.
 The NCAA tournament officially expanded to 68 teams as the NCAA announced that Dayton, Ohio would be the site of the "First Four" opening games.
 The AP preseason All-American team was named on November 1. Duke's Kyle Singler was the leading vote-getter with 62 of a possible 65 votes. Joining Singler were Kansas State guard Jacob Pullen (53 votes), BYU guard Jimmer Fredette (49), Purdue center JaJuan Johnson (46) and North Carolina forward Harrison Barnes (17). Barnes became the first freshman in history to be named to the preseason team.
 Michigan State head coach Tom Izzo had to serve a one-game suspension in December for a secondary violation of NCAA recruitment rules. He had hired an associate of a potential recruit to help during a youth basketball camp in June. Also, Tennessee head coach Bruce Pearl was suspended for the first eight conference games and received a $1.5 million salary reduction due to recruiting violations and providing false information during the NCAA investigation.
 On February 22, 2011, Matt Howard of Butler was named Academic All-American of the Year.
 The March 13 airing of the ESPN films documentary The Fab Five, a followup to its 30 for 30 series, sparked national outrage that lead to a series of media exchanges between members of the press, Michigan Wolverines men's basketball players and Duke Blue Devils men's basketball players in forums such as The New York Times, The Wall Street Journal and The Washington Post.

Milestones and records 
 Duke coach Mike Krzyzewski won his 800th game at Duke on November 24, making him the fifth ever coach to reach that milestone at one school.
 Belmont coach Rick Byrd won his 600th game on January 30.
 Jimmer Fredette became the all-time leading scorer in Mountain West Conference history on February 4, 2011. Then, behind his career high 52-point outburst against New Mexico on March 11, he became BYU's all-time leading scorer after surpassing Danny Ainge.
 On February 19, 2011, Morehead State's Kenneth Faried grabbed 12 rebounds, giving him 1,576 for his career, and broke Tim Duncan's modern-era NCAA rebounding record. Duncan's rebounding total of 1,570 had stood since 1997.
 Charles Jenkins of Hofstra surpassed Antoine Agudio as the school's all-time leading scorer. He broke the previous record of 2,286 points on January 29, 2011, in a game against Drexel. Jenkins graduated as the Colonial Athletic Association's second all-time leading scorer behind Navy's David Robinson, whose 2,669 points remain the CAA's most ever.
 Providence's Marshon Brooks set a new Big East regular season record for single-game scoring as he netted 52 points against Notre Dame in a 94–93 loss to the Irish.
 Hofstra guard Charles Jenkins, College of Charleston guard Andrew Goudelock, Duke forward Kyle Singler, UTEP guard Randy Culpepper, BYU guard Jimmer Fredette, Baylor guard LaceDarius Dunn, Boston University forward John Holland, Virginia Tech guard Malcolm Delaney, Appalachian State guard Donald Sims, Seton Hall guard Jeremy Hazell, Penn State guard Talor Battle, Purdue guard E'Twaun Moore, Kansas State guard Jacob Pullen, Richmond guard Kevin Anderson, Nicholls State forward Anatoly Bose, Lipscomb center Adnan Hodzic, Ole Miss guard Chris Warren, Wofford forward Noah Dahlman Morehead State center Kenneth Faried, and Colorado guard Cory Higgins each passed the 2,000 point mark for their careers.
 After defeating Texas A&M in their next to last regular season game of the year, Kansas clinched at least a share of their seventh straight Big 12 Conference regular season title. It is the most consecutive conference championships from a power conference since John Wooden's UCLA Bruins won 13 straight from 1967–1979.
 Pittsburgh head coach Jamie Dixon set the Division I record for most wins in a coach's first eight seasons after defeating South Florida on March 2. It was his 214th career win.
 Butler set a Horizon League record with their fifth straight conference championship, shared or outright, breaking the previous record of four consecutive regular season championships, also set by Butler from 2000 to 2003.
 Xavier won their fifth straight conference championship, shared or outright, which matched the Atlantic 10 Conference record.
 Over the course of the 2010–11 Ivy League season, Harvard became the final member of the Ivy League to win at least a share of one men's basketball regular season championship since the league was formed during the 1956–57 season.
 Saint Joseph's coach Phil Martelli won his 300th game on March 11. It happened after a 93–90 overtime win against Duquesne in the quarterfinals of the Atlantic 10 Conference tournament.
 Ohio State guard David Lighty broke the all-time career games played record on March 12. The fifth-year senior appeared in his 153rd game, breaking the previous record of 152 set by Deon Thompson in 2009–10.
 Duke's Kyle Singler and Morehead State's Kenneth Faried each eclipsed the dual 2000 points and 1000 rebounds thresholds, joining an exclusive list of NCAA Division I players to accomplish both feats.

New arenas 
 Auburn moved from one on-campus venue to another, leaving behind their home since 1969, Beard–Eaves–Memorial Coliseum, for the new Auburn Arena. The Tigers' first game at their new home was a 79–66 win in a preseason exhibition against Division II West Alabama on November 3, 2010. The first regular-season game was a 70–69 overtime loss to UNC Asheville on November 13, 2010.
 Louisville moved from Freedom Hall at the Kentucky Exposition Center, their home since 1956, to the KFC Yum! Center in downtown Louisville. The Cardinals' first game at their new home was an 83–66 win in a preseason exhibition against then-Division II Northern Kentucky on October 31, 2010. The first regular-season game was an 88–73 win over Butler on November 16, 2010.
 Oregon opened Matthew Knight Arena, the replacement for venerable McArthur Court, on January 13, 2011. The Ducks defeated USC, 68–62.

Season outlook

Pre-season polls 

The top 25 from the AP and ESPN/USA Today Coaches Polls, October 28, 2010.

Conference membership changes 

These schools joined new conferences for the 2010–11 season.

Regular season 
A number of early-season tournaments marked the beginning of the college basketball season.

Early-season tournaments 

*Although these tournaments include more teams, only 4 play for the championship.

Conference winners and tournaments 
Thirty athletic conferences each end their regular seasons with a single-elimination tournament. The teams in each conference that win their regular season title are given the number one seed in each tournament. The winners of these tournaments receive automatic invitations to the 2011 NCAA Division I men's basketball tournament. The Ivy League does not have a conference tournament, instead giving their automatic invitation to their regular-season champion. By contrast, the Atlantic Coast Conference does not have a regular-season champion, using the standings only for seeding purposes in its conference tournament.

Statistical leaders

Conference standings

Postseason tournaments

NCAA tournament

Final Four – Reliant Stadium, Houston, Texas

Tournament upsets 
A "major upset" is defined as a win by a team seeded 7 or more spots below its defeated opponent.

National Invitation tournament 

After the NCAA Tournament field was announced, the National Invitation Tournament invited 32 teams to participate.

NIT Semifinals and Final 
Played at Madison Square Garden in New York City

College Basketball Invitational 

The fourth College Basketball Invitational (CBI) Tournament was held beginning March 15 and ended with a best-of-three final, ending April 1. Creighton hosted Game 1 of the Championship Series, while Oregon hosted Games 2 and 3. Oregon defeated Creighton, 2 games to 1.

CollegeInsider.com tournament 

The third CollegeInsider.com Postseason Tournament was held beginning March 14 and ended with a championship game on March 30. This tournament places an emphasis on selecting successful teams from "mid-major" conferences who were left out of the NCAA Tournament and NIT. Santa Clara defeated Iona 76–69 in the final, as Santa Clara's Kevin Foster was tournament MVP.

Award winners

Consensus All-American teams

Major player of the year awards 
 Wooden Award: Jimmer Fredette, Brigham Young
 Naismith Award: Jimmer Fredette, Brigham Young
 Associated Press Player of the Year: Jimmer Fredette, Brigham Young
 NABC Player of the Year: Jimmer Fredette, Brigham Young
 Oscar Robertson Trophy (USBWA): Jimmer Fredette, Brigham Young
 Adolph Rupp Trophy: Jimmer Fredette, Brigham Young
 Sporting News Player of the Year: Jimmer Fredette, Brigham Young

Major freshman of the year awards 
 USBWA Freshman of the Year: Jared Sullinger, Ohio State
 Sporting News Freshman of the Year: Jared Sullinger, Ohio State

Major coach of the year awards 
 Associated Press Coach of the Year: Mike Brey, Notre Dame
 Henry Iba Award (USBWA): Mike Brey, Notre Dame
 NABC Coach of the Year: Steve Fisher, San Diego State
 Naismith College Coach of the Year: Steve Fisher, San Diego State
 Adolph Rupp Cup: Steve Fisher, San Diego State
 Sporting News Coach of the Year: Jamie Dixon, Pittsburgh

Other major awards 
 Bob Cousy Award (Best point guard): Kemba Walker, Connecticut
 Pete Newell Big Man Award (Best big man): JaJuan Johnson, Purdue
 NABC Defensive Player of the Year: Kenneth Faried, Morehead State
 Frances Pomeroy Naismith Award (Best senior 6'0"/1.83 m or shorter): Jacob Pullen, Kansas State
 Lowe's Senior CLASS Award (top senior): Jimmer Fredette, Brigham Young
 Robert V. Geasey Trophy (Top player in Philadelphia Big 5): Lavoy Allen, Temple
 NIT/Haggerty Award (Top player in New York City metro area): Charles Jenkins, Hofstra
 Ben Jobe Award (Top minority coach): Cuonzo Martin, Missouri State
 Hugh Durham Award (Top mid-major coach): Rick Byrd, Belmont
 Jim Phelan Award (Top head coach): Stew Morrill, Utah State
 Lefty Driesell Award (Top defensive player): Kent Bazemore, Old Dominion
 Lou Henson Award (Top mid-major player): Matt Howard, Butler
 Lute Olson Award (Top non-freshman or transfer player): Kemba Walker, Connecticut
 Skip Prosser Man of the Year Award (Coach with moral character): Chris Mack, Xavier
 Chip Hilton Player of the Year Award (Strong personal character): Charles Jenkins, Hofstra
 Elite 88 Award (Top GPA at Final Four): Matt Howard, Butler

Coaching changes 
A number of teams changed coaches during and after the season.

References